Tipaso was a settlement and station (mutatio) of ancient Thrace which was inhabited during Byzantine times. 

Its site is located northwest of Çorlu in European Turkey.

References

Populated places in ancient Thrace
Former populated places in Turkey
Populated places of the Byzantine Empire
History of Tekirdağ Province